Police ranks of Sweden are the police ranks used by the Swedish Police Authority.

New organization

Old organization

Notes

References

External links 
 Utrikes namnbok, 9th edition, issued by the Ministry for Foreign Affairs

Law enforcement in Sweden
Sweden
Sweden
Law enforcement-related lists
Sweden-related lists